Chaceon crosnieri is a species of crab. 

Chaceon crosnieri differs from C. affinis in that the carapace is more inflated, the outer orbital and the suborbital teeth are stronger, the subdistal tooth on the merus of the cheliped is stronger and the cheliped is smoother dorsally; the carpus of the walking legs lacks dorsal spinules, and the merus of the walking legs has a strong distal dorsal spine. Chaceon crosnieri is a smoother species than C. bicolor, with shorter and stouter legs, the suborbital spine is lower and blunter, and the distal projection on the merus of the walking legs is much less developed in larger specimens. 

This species is named after Alain Crosnier (1930-2021).

Description
Its carapace is 1.2 times broader than long and very inflated dorsally. The carapace is relatively smooth, with small granules and pits on the branchial, cardiac, and gastric regions; hepatic regions smooth. The suborbital tooth is sharp in females, while being short and blunt in males, scarcely visible in dorsal view.

The median pair of frontal teeth are narrower than the laterals. All five anterolateral teeth are reduced, the distance from the first to the second equal to the distance from the third to the fourth. The cheliped is lightly granular; merus with sharp subdistal spine; carpus irregular dorsally, with a sharp inner tooth; propodus with some small tubercles dorsally and lacking a distal spine.

The dactyli of its walking legs is laterally compressed. Some males show the tips of fingers of the chela with a red band proximally, and apices whitish.

Distribution

References

External links

ADW entry
WORMS entry

Portunoidea
Crustaceans described in 1989